Tom Walters may refer to:

Tom Walters (American football) (born 1942), safety for the Washington Redskins
Tom Walters (association footballer) (1909–1968), forward in the Football League
Tom Walters (American politician), member of the Wyoming House of Representatives
Tom Walters (broadcaster), chief of the CTV News Los Angeles bureau
Thomas Walters (South African politician), member of the National Assembly of South Africa

See also
Thomas Waters (disambiguation)
Thomas Walter (disambiguation)